9/10 may refer to:21
September 10 (month-day date notation)
October 9 (day-month date notation)
The fraction, nine tenths